Rose-Marie Losier-Cool (born June 18, 1937) is a retired Canadian Senator for New Brunswick.

A member of New Brunswick's Acadian community, Losier-Cool worked as a teacher for thirty-three years, two decades of which were spent at École secondaire Népisiguit in Bathurst, New Brunswick.

She was elected the first woman president of the Association des enseignantes et des enseignants francophones du Nouveau-Brunswick in 1983 and has sat on the board of directors of the Canadian Teachers' Federation. She was awarded the Teacher of the Year Award for non-sexist teaching by the government of New Brunswick in 1993. In 1994–95, she was Vice-President of the New Brunswick Advisory Council on the Status of Women.

Losier-Cool was appointed to the Senate on March 21, 1995 on the advice of then Prime Minister of Canada Jean Chrétien and sits as a Liberal. In January 2004, she was appointed Government Whip in the Senate, the first woman ever to hold this role. Loisier-Cool left the Senate upon reaching the mandatory retirement age of 75 on June 18, 2012.

External links
 
Liberal Senate Forum

1937 births
Living people
Liberal Party of Canada senators
Canadian senators from New Brunswick
Canadian schoolteachers
Women members of the Senate of Canada
Women in New Brunswick politics
21st-century Canadian politicians
21st-century Canadian women politicians